Yim Kyung-jin (born 23 April 1978; also known as Yim Jae-eun) is a South Korean badminton player. Yim was crowned as the women's doubles champion at the 2000 Asian Championships partnered with Lee Hyo-jung. She and Lee also competed at the 2000 Summer Olympics in Sydney, Australia.

Achievements

Asian Games 
Mixed doubles

Asian Championships 
Women's doubles

East Asian Games 
Mixed doubles

World Junior Championships 
Girls' doubles

IBF World Grand Prix 
The World Badminton Grand Prix was sanctioned by the International Badminton Federation from 1983 to 2006.

Women's doubles

BWF International 
Women's doubles

Mixed doubles

References

External links 
 
 

1978 births
Living people
South Korean female badminton players
Badminton players at the 2000 Summer Olympics
Olympic badminton players of South Korea
Badminton players at the 1998 Asian Games
Asian Games silver medalists for South Korea
Asian Games medalists in badminton
Medalists at the 1998 Asian Games